Deliverance Point is a rocky point  south of Cape Tuxen on the west coast of Graham Land. It was discovered by the French Antarctic Expedition, 1908–10, under Jean-Baptiste Charcot, and was so named because Charcot and two companions were rescued here after being separated from the ship Pourquoi-Pas? for several days, while on an exploration of the area in a small boat.

References

Headlands of Graham Land
Graham Coast